Mohan veena refers to either of two distinct plucked string instruments used in Indian classical music, especially Hindustani classical music which is associated with the northern parts of the Indian subcontinent.

The first of these was a mix of the sarod, veena and surbahar, developed in 1948 by Radhika Mohan Maitra. In 1949, Thakur Jaidev Singh, the then chief producer of All India Radio, named the instrument ‘Mohan veena’ after him. Pandit Maitra performed 22 national programs and several AIR recordings with the instrument before his untimely death in 1981. These recordings are treasures of AIR archives and now available in public domain.

The second instrument is a modified archtop Hawaiian guitar, created by Vishwa Mohan Bhatt, and is the instrument most commonly referred to by the name Mohan veena. This instrument has between 19 and 21 strings in total: three to four melody and four to five drone strings strung from the peghead, and twelve sympathetic strings strung to the tuners mounted on the side of the neck. A gourd (tumba) is screwed into the back of the neck for improved sustain and resonance. It is held in the lap and played with a bar like a slide guitar.

See also
 Pandit Vishwa Mohan Bhatt
 Slide Guitar

References

External links
Rare Strains
Writeup about the modified guitar on Music Aloud

Guitars
Hindustani musical instruments
Indian musical instruments
String instruments with sympathetic strings